Aliaksandr Ivanavich Bury (also spelt Alexander Bury), (born 14 September 1987) is a Belarusian professional tennis player and competes mainly on the ATP Challenger Tour and ITF Futures, both in singles and doubles.

He has won one doubles title at ATP World Tour with Denis Istomin.

Bury reached his highest ATP singles ranking, No. 366 on 10 February 2014, and his highest ATP doubles ranking, No. 59, on 19 October 2015.

Bury has represented Belarus at Davis Cup, where he has a win–loss record of 8–5.

ATP finals

Doubles (1-0)

ITF finals (30-33)

Singles (1–1)

Doubles (29-32)

References

External links
 
 
 
 
 
 

1987 births
Living people
Belarusian male tennis players
Tennis players at the 2012 Summer Olympics
Tennis players at the 2016 Summer Olympics
Olympic tennis players of Belarus
Universiade medalists in tennis
Universiade silver medalists for Belarus
Universiade bronze medalists for Belarus
Tennis players from Minsk
Medalists at the 2011 Summer Universiade
Medalists at the 2013 Summer Universiade